Gabriel Rangers is a Gaelic Athletic Association club based in the villages of Schull, and Ballydehob in County Cork, Ireland. The club fields team in both Gaelic football and hurling.

Achievements

 Cork Intermediate Football Championship  Runners Up 2019
 Munster Junior Club Football Championship Runners up: 2016
 Cork Junior Football Championship Winners 2016
 Cork Minor B Football Championship Winners (3) 1988, 2004, 2017  Runner-Up 2002
 Cork Junior B Hurling Championship Winners (1) 1989
 Carbery Junior A Football Championship Winners (2) 2010, 2016  Runner-Up 1979, 1983, 2005, 2014
 West Cork Junior B Football Championship Winners (1) 1978  Runner-Up 1952 (as Ballydehob), 1977
 West Cork Junior C Football Championship Runner-Up 2007, 2018
 West Cork Junior C Football Championship Winners (1) 1989  Runner-Up 1999
 West Cork Junior D Football Championship Winners (2) 1990, 2002
 West Cork Minor B Football Championship Winners (7) 1987, 1988, 1994, 1996, 2002, 2004, 2017 Runner-Up 1979, 2000
 West Cork Under-21 B Football Championship Winners (4)1981, 2003, 2012 ,2021,Runner-Up 1997
 West Cork Under-21 C Football Championship Winners (1) 2007  Runner-Up 2006
 West Cork Junior B Hurling Championship Winners (4) 1950 (as Ballydehob), 1978, 1988, 1989.  Runner-Up 1952 (as Ballydehob), 1976, 1987, 1998, 2007
 West Cork Minor A Hurling Championship Winners (1) 1979  Runner-Up 1978, 1991, 1987, 1988, 1989
 West Cork Minor B Hurling Championship Winners (1) 1986  Runner-Up 1978, 1979, 1981, 1994
 West Cork Under-21 B Hurling Championship''' Winners (3) 1987, 1988, 1992  Runner-Up 1984

References

Hurling clubs in County Cork
Gaelic football clubs in County Cork
Gaelic games clubs in County Cork